Andrew Patrick Arthur Steptoe  (born 24 April 1951) is a British psychologist and epidemiologist and Head of the Department of Behavioural Science and Health at University College London. He is a pioneer in health psychology and behavioural medicine in the UK and internationally, known for his work on psychosocial factors in cardiovascular disease, ageing, and positive wellbeing and health.

Early life and education 
Andrew Patrick Arthur Steptoe was born at St George's Hospital, Hyde Park Corner, London, the son of Patrick Steptoe, the obstetrician and gynaecologist responsible for the first IVF birth and Sheena (née Kennedy), an actress. He was brought up in Rochdale, Lancs, and was educated at Uppingham School.  He won a choral exhibition to Gonville and Caius College, Cambridge, from which he graduated with a First Class degree in Natural Sciences in 1972. He subsequently moved to Magdalen College, Oxford, where in 1976 he completed a DPhil on biofeedback and cardiovascular disease in the department of psychiatry.

Career and research
Steptoe was appointed a lecturer at Christ Church, Oxford, held concurrently with a Medical Research Council Training Fellowship in 1975. He resigned these posts in 1977 to take up a lectureship in the newly formed Department of Psychology at St. George's Hospital Medical School in 1977.  He continued to work at St. George's for 22 years, and was promoted to senior lecturer in 1981 and to Reader in 1987, before being appointed professor and head of department in 1988. His teaching of psychology to medical students resulted in a textbook Essential Psychology for Medical Practice. In 1983, he was appointed project leader of a Concerted Action on Breakdown in Human Adaptation by the Commission of the European Communities DG XII, continuing this work coordinating projects on stress and health across Europe until 1991.

He was involved in the early international development of behavioural medicine. He was chair of the scientific program committee for the first International Congress of Behavioral Medicine (Uppsala, 1990), and served as President of the International Society of Behavioral Medicine from 1994 to 1996. Steptoe was also involved in the professional development of health psychology in the UK. He was a founding member of the Division of Health Psychology of the British Psychological Society, and was founding editor (in collaboration with Jane Wardle) of the British Journal of Health Psychology from 1995 to 2001. He was also associate editor of Psychophysiology (1982–1986), the Journal of Psychophysiology (1987–1989), the Journal of Psychosomatic Research (1989–1997), the Annals of Behavioral Medicine (1992–1997), the British Journal of Clinical Psychology (1992–1995), and the International Journal of Rehabilitation and Health (1995–2002). He is currently associate editor of Aging and Mechanisms of Disease, and section editor of Current Cardiology Reports. He has served on the editorial boards of 14 other international journals. Steptoe was awarded a DSc by London University in 1995.

In 2000, Steptoe moved to the Department of Epidemiology and Public Health at University College London to become the first British Heart Foundation professor of psychology, a post he held until 2016. He was appointed head of the Department of Epidemiology and Public Health in 2010, before becoming director of the Institute of Epidemiology and Health Care at University College London (2011–2017). He is programme director of the Health Psychology MSc at UCL.

Steptoe has made significant contributions to several aspects of health psychology and behavioural medicine. He has been involved in the identification of the psychobiological pathways that link population-level risk factors such as low socioeconomic status and work stress with atherogenesis and cardiovascular disease progression. He has advanced understanding of how psychosocial factors get under the skin by discovering that inflammatory cytokines and haemostatic factors respond acutely to mental stress, and that rates of post-stress recovery in biological measures differ critically across psychosocial risk groups. He has also advanced the theoretical underpinning of psychobiological processes, building on allostatic theory to formulate a taxonomy of autonomic, neuroendocrine, inflammatory, and immune pathways through which life experiences influence disease risk. Steptoe is involved in research on the determinants of healthy lifestyles, the relation of depression to physical health, and links between mental health and physical activity.   Additionally, as principal investigator of the English Longitudinal Study of Ageing, he has promoted the interdisciplinary investigation of population ageing, contributing to understanding of the impact of social isolation and loneliness on health, and the relationship between subjective wellbeing and health at older ages.

Music and cultural history work 

Steptoe has also contributed to cultural and musical studies. He has written several articles and a book on the cultural background of Mozart operas, together with a general biography of Mozart in which the text was coupled with recordings of his work. He edited a collection of studies of creativity and temperament in the historical record, and has contributed research on Renaissance and 18th century history. With Ruth Edwards, he coedited the second edition of A Matter of Life, an account of the development of IVF by his father Patrick Steptoe and Nobel laureate Robert Edwards.

Awards and honours 

1988	Fellow, British Psychological Society
2001	Fellow, Academy of Social Sciences (FAcSS)
2003	Member, Academia Europaea (MAE) 
2007	Elected a Fellow of the Academy of Medical Sciences (FMedSci) 
2010	Fellow, Academy of Behavioral Medicine Research
2011	Contributions in Positive Health Award, International Positive Psychology Association
2014	Fellow, Gerontological Society of America
2017	Patricia Barchas Award for Sociophysiology, American Psychosomatic Society
2018 Highly Cited Researcher, Web of Science
2019 Highly Cited Researcher, Web of Science
2020 Highly Cited Researcher, Web of Science
2021   Fellow, British Academy

References 

1951 births
Living people
People educated at Uppingham School
Alumni of Gonville and Caius College, Cambridge
Alumni of Magdalen College, Oxford
British psychologists
Fellows of the British Psychological Society
Fellows of the Academy of Social Sciences
Fellows of the Academy of Medical Sciences (United Kingdom)
Members of Academia Europaea